Nicola Palazzo (Castelluccio Superiore (PZ), 10 June 1957) is an Italian writer.

Biography 
He graduated in Philosophy at Florence university in 1980. He is a professor of Italian, history and geography. He has written several books, including  Martino di Monte Oliveto (1997), Racconti di Natale, racconti paradossali.

Books
Martino di monte Oliveto, Di Maremmi Editore, March 1997, pag.216.
“Racconti di Natale” Brigante Editore Lagonegro (PZ), November 1997, Page 160.
“Racconti paradossali”Taurus Editore Torino. December 2000. Page 63.

References 

Italian male writers
Italian academics
Living people
1957 births